Brian Gordon Chewter (2 February 1954 – 26 July 2020) was a Canadian cyclist. He competed at the 1972 and 1976 Summer Olympics.

He died from cancer on 26 July 2020 at the age of 66.

References

External links
 

1954 births
2020 deaths
Canadian male cyclists
Cyclists at the 1972 Summer Olympics
Cyclists at the 1976 Summer Olympics
Olympic cyclists of Canada
Sportspeople from Hamilton, Ontario